Argopteron aureum is a butterfly of the family Hesperiidae. It was described by Peña in 1968. It is found in Chile.

References

 Argopteron aureum in butterfliesofamerica

Butterflies described in 1968
Heteropterinae
Endemic fauna of Chile